Hoverspeed was a ferry company that operated on the English Channel from 1981 until 2005. It was formed in 1981 by the merger of Seaspeed and Hoverlloyd. Its last owners were Sea Containers; the company ran a small fleet of two high-speed SeaCat catamaran ferries in its final year.

Hoverspeed played a part in developing the hovercraft, and ran six SR.N4 Mountbatten class hovercraft and one SEDAM N500 Naviplane. Hoverspeed last operated hovercraft on its Dover to Calais service. They were withdrawn on 1 October 2000 and Hoverspeed continued to use Seacat catamarans built by Incat.

Background and formation

Early attempts to consolidate operations 
During the early 1970s, when both Hoverlloyd and Seaspeed were struggling to return a profit, the two operators had been in negotiations on a partnership to amalgamate operations.  However, management at Hoverlloyd was not convinced the UK government would sanction any form of arrangement between Seaspeed and a foreign company.  The situation was exacerbated when discussions became public knowledge and plans for a consortium were quickly abandoned.

Loss-making company 
In late 1981, when the two companies eventually merged, the situation was dire.  Despite a valuation at £110 million, combined losses were £8 million with ticket prices 25 to 30% higher than the ferries.  Under the terms of the merger, Hoverspeed was also under obligation to accept the two French hovercraft in exchange for a 10% participation in share capital by French state-owned SNCF.  The new company was spearheaded by Gerry Draper, new Chief Executive and a former marketing director at British Airways.  Draper had been involved in filling empty passenger seats aboard the new Boeing 747 jumbo jets in the early 1970s when IATA regulations prohibited discounting.  He was also successful in turning Concorde services profitable.

Nevertheless, a number of early decisions plagued the new company.  First, Hoverspeed inherited an antiquated reservation system which was inadequate, resulting in potential travellers having great difficulty in contacting Hoverspeed and many being told crossings were fully booked when they were not. This necessitated the reversion to a very basic manual reservation system to try to cope with demand.  In 1982, loss income was estimated at between £3 million and £4 million.  Second, excess capacity drove profit margins down.  The most damaging mistake was to increase the number of crossings operated, over 10,000 in 1982, which did not match demand and the decision to briefly re-open the Ramsgate route for the summer season which was counter-productive.  Third, parity pricing continued with ferry operators, even during peak season.  This was a source of concern since 70% of the turnover (and traffic) was generated during the summer season between mid-June and mid-September.

Despite carrying 2.5 million passengers and 400,000 vehicles, a 21% market share, with 35% fewer flights and 250 staff made redundant, the new entity continued to register losses with £5.5 million for the year 1982, £3.5 million in 1983.  The new French hovercraft, the N500, achieved only 60% reliability and did not meet ride comfortability or controllability and eventually broken up for spares and scraps.   The SR.N4 craft, moreover, could not accommodate the recently introduced double-deck and one-and-a-half deck coaches and this part of the market was lost.  By 1984, the company was near collapse.

Management buy-out 
In February 1984, the UK government refused to provide further guaranteed loans, British Rail sold its 50% ownership which it had retained in the company (and its losses) for a nominal sum of £1 to a syndicate consortium of 5 directors.  Thus, Hoverspeed was effectively given away to its own management and was wholly owned within the private sector backed by merchant bank Kleinwort Benson providing guarantees and underwriting the cash needed to operate via NatWest.

The company immediately adopted premium instead of parity pricing, justified on the grounds that a faster service was expected to be more expensive. An aggressive advertising campaign was mounted against the ferries and more effort was made to target fares accurately.  For 1984, the company made a loss of              £621,000.   Its performance went up with a pre-tax profit of £194,000 for 1985 with an increase in US passengers.  This figure rose to £625,000 in 1986.

Purchase by British Ferries Ltd 
Ripe for sale, in February 1986, Hoverspeed was sold by the management consortium to British Ferries (Sealink UK's holding company) owned by Sea Containers, a transport group engaged in marine container leasing, manufacturing, depot and logistics operations, railways operator, ferry operator and leisure industry investor for a sum of £5 million, each syndicate making a profit of £600,000.   Large financial gains made by former managers of British Rail was to become a feature of rail privatization.

In 1987, Hoverspeed returned a profit of £1.6 million with a turnover of £42.3 million per year and £4.7 million in 1988 and a turnover of £44 million per year.

Being part of a larger shipping company allowed fresh re-capitalization, cheaper fuel as well as access to legal services.  With the reduced fleet of hovercraft aging, it also permitted capital investment into more fuel efficient vessels with the first SeaCat catamaran services introduced in 1991 and larger Super SeaCats in 1997, the latter to achieve economies of scale in the face of stiff competition from the Channel Tunnel and the ferry companies.

Routes 
Hoverspeed operated several routes. These were:

 Dover – Calais (1981–2005; Hovercraft, Seacat and SuperSeaCat service): Hoverspeed's primary service was established by British Rail owned Seaspeed in 1968 with the car carrying SRN 4 Hovercraft  The Princess Anne and The Princess Margaret. Seaspeed were not the first hovercraft service between Dover and Calais, Townsend Car Ferries had operated a passenger-only SR.N6 in 1966. Hoverlloyd also ran hovercraft services in 1966 to Calais but from Ramsgate. Seacats were introduced on the route on 2 June 1991. It was intended that the Seacats would replace the remaining SRN 4 hovercraft but this did not happen until 2000.  The Dover – Calais service has seen all members of the Hoverspeed fleet operation on it at some point. The route closed on 7 November 2005, the Seacat Diamant operating the last crossing.
 Dover – Boulogne-sur-Mer (1968–1993; Hovercraft and Seacat service): the Dover-Boulogne route was opened in 1966 by Townsend Car Ferries using an SR.N6 passenger-only hovercraft. In 1993 Hoverspeed closed the Dover-Boulogne route after deciding that the Hoverport at Le Portel (near Boulogne-sur-Mer) was no longer required, and the SeaCat operation moved to nearby Folkestone.
 Dover – Ostend (1998–2003; Seacat and Superseacat service): after the failure of the Holyman Sally Line service from Ramsgate to Ostend, Holyman became partners with Hoverspeed and moved the service to Dover. The 81m Incat fastcraft used on the service lost their 'Holyman' prefix and became the Rapide and Diamant. Sea Containers later bought Holyman's share in the operation and the fastcraft.
 Folkestone – Boulogne (1993–2000; Seacat service): after transferring the Boulogne route to Folkestone, Hoverspeed used Hoverspeed Great Britain and kept the hovercraft at Dover. In 2000 the Hoverspeed service ended and in 2001 the port at Folkestone closed to all ferry traffic after the termination of the Falcon Marfreight service.
 Newhaven – Dieppe (1999–2004; Superseacat and Seacat service): Hoverspeed took over the high-speed passenger service after P&O Stena Line's withdrawal the year before. The route was continued using SuperSeaCat One. Hoverspeed's last service on the route was at the end of the 2004 summer season. Despite taking bookings for 2005 they withdrew from the route: a deal that would have seen Transmanche Ferries charter  Superseacat One for the route fell through.
 Portsmouth – Cherbourg (1990–1991): Hoverspeed's first Seacat route using the Hoverspeed Great Britain; this was closed on 6 January 1991 after a series of technical problems throughout the operating season.

Hoverspeed briefly ran services from Ramsgate Pegwell Bay Hoverport in 1982 which had been the base of Hoverlloyd hovercraft services.

Fleet

Hovercraft

 The Princess Anne (built 1968): built by British Hovercraft Corporation for Seaspeed and stretched in 1977. Transferred to Hoverspeed on creation of the company in 1981. Withdrawn in 2000. Currently at the Hovercraft Museum at HMS Daedalus.
 The Princess Margaret (built 1968): built by British Hovercraft Corporation for Seaspeed and stretched in 1977. Transferred to Hoverspeed on creation of the company in 1981. Withdrawn in 2000. Scrapped at the Hovercraft Museum at HMS Daedalus in 2018.
 Swift (built 1969): built by British Hovercraft Corporation for Hoverlloyd. Transferred to Hoverspeed on creation of the company in 1981. Withdrawn in 1991. Scrapped in 2004.
 Sure (built 1969): built by British Hovercraft Corporation for Hoverlloyd. Transferred to Hoverspeed on creation of the company in 1981. Withdrawn in 1983. Scrapped at Pegwell Bay between 1983 and 1987.
 Sir Christopher (built 1972): built for by British Hovercraft Corporation for Hoverlloyd. Transferred to Hoverspeed on creation of the company in 1981. Scrapped in 1998.
 The Prince Of Wales (built 1977): built by British Hovercraft Corporation for Hoverlloyd. Transferred to Hoverspeed on creation of the company in 1981.  Scrapped after an electrical fire in 1993.
 Ingénieur Jean Bertin (built 1977): a SEDAM N500 Naviplane built for SNCF by SEDAM for use on the Seaspeed route. Transferred to Hoverspeed in 1983 after a number of modifications, but was returned to the SNCF later that year after Hoverspeed decided that she was not suitable for their services. Scrapped in 1985 at the Boulogne Hoverport.

Incat 74 metre (243') catamarans

 Hoverspeed Great Britain (Incat hull 025, built 1990). A former holder of the Hales Trophy for fastest crossing of the Atlantic Ocean, it initially entered service on Portsmouth – Cherbourg but later transferred to Dover – Calais and Boulogne and then to Folkestone – Boulogne. It was chartered to Emeraude Ferries in 2004 and renamed Emeraude GB. In 2005 it was chartered to Aegean Speed Lines in Greece, running from Piraeus (Athens) – Folegandros as Speedrunner 1. It was in service with Hoverspeed from 1990–1991, 1993–2000 and 2002–2003. It left the fleet in 2003 and was laid up.
 Hoverspeed France (Incat hull 026, built 1991) operated for Hoverspeed under several names. It was renamed Seacat Boulogne in 1993, transferred to the Isle of Man Steam Packet Company (IOMSPC) as Seacat Isle of Man in 1994 but returned under that name to Hoverspeed in 1996 and 1997. In 1996 it was renamed Seacat Norge and chartered to ColorSeacat, a joint venture between Sea Containers and Color Line. Renamed Seacat Isle of Man again in 1997, it had its final season with Hoverspeed on the Dover – Calais route in 1998 before returning to IOMSPC as Seacat Isle of Man. In 2005 it was chartered to Irish Sea Express and renamed Sea Express 1. The charter ended later that year and it reverted to Steam Packet service. On 3 February 2007 it collided with the Alaska Rainbow in thick fog off in the River Mersey, sustaining severe damage to her starboard hull. Over 2007 it was laid up and later repaired. It was renamed Snaefell in December 2007 and prepared for service in 2008 for the Steam Packet. It is currently operating for Seajets in Greece as HSC Caldera Vista.
 Hoverspeed Belgium (Incat Hull 027, built 1991) was renamed Hoverspeed Boulogne before entering service in 1992. In 1993 it was transferred to Sea Containers route from Frederikshavn to Gothenburg as Seacatamaran Danmark, shortened to Seacat Danmark in 1994. Until 1997 it provided cover on various Hoverspeed and Sea Containers ferry routes but remained on Dover – Calais between 2000 and 2003. It was transferred to SNAV in a joint venture with Sea Containers initially as Pescara Jet but is now named Zara Jet.
 Seacat Tasmania (Incat Hull 023, built 1990) operated for Hoverspeed in 1992 on the Folkestone – Boulogne route and in 1993 on Dover – Calais along with the Folkestone service.  Renamed Seacat Calais in mid-1993 before being chartered out in late 1993, it returned to Hoverspeed in 1999 and ran on the Dover-Calais service. In 2000 it moved to the SNAV/Sea Containers joint venture as Croazia Jet before again returning to Hoverspeed in 2002 as Seacat France. It was chartered by Emeraude Ferries as Emeraude France for two months in 2005. It was sold to an unknown buyer for a reported US$2 million in February 2007. It is now operating in Greece for Seajets as Sea Speed Jet.
 Seacat Scotland (Incat hull 028, built 1992) was built for Sea Containers's Stranraer - Belfast SeaCat service, which in 2000 changed to Belfast - Troon before closing altogether on Monday 1 November 2004. SeaCat Scotland left Belfast on Thursday 28 November 2002 at 0600. It operated for Hoverspeed on the Dover - Calais route in 1992, 2003 and 2004. It is now operating in Greece for Seajets as HSC Cyclades Express.

Fincantieri MDV1200 Superseacats

Four Superseacats were ordered by Hoverspeed's parent company Sea Containers after the original Superseacat design built by Austal failed to meet the speed required.

 Superseacat One (built 1997). Entered service in 1997.
 After operating on Sea Containers Frederikshavn to Gothenburg route the vessel entered service with Hoverspeed in 2000 on the Newhaven - Dieppe route. In 2001 she moved to operate with two of her sisters on the Dover - Calais and Ostend routes. She returned to the Dieppe route in 2002 where she remained until the end of the 2004 summer season when the Hoverspeed service from the port ended.

In service with Hoverspeed 1999–2004. Left fleet in 2004, chartered.

 Superseacat Two (built 1997). Entered service in 1997.
 Entered service with Hoverspeed in June 1997 on the Dover – Calais service where she remained until March 1998. She moved to the Sea Containers/Isle of Man Steam Packet Company (IOMSPC) Liverpool – Dublin service. She was replaced in that service by her sister Superseacat Three in 1999 so she moved back to Hoverspeed for the Newhaven - Dieppe service for a season. In 2001 she returned to Dover to operate with two of her sisters on the Dover – Calais and Ostend routes. At somepoint she operated on the Heysham – Belfast route before returning again to the Dieppe route in 2003.

In serviced with Hoverspeed 1997, 1999 and 2001. Left fleet in 2001, sold.

 Superseacat Three (built 1999).
 Entered service on the Sea Containers/Isle of Man Steam Packet Company Liverpool – Dublin service in 1999 before moving to Hoverspeed to Dover to operate with two of her sisters on the Dover – Calais and Ostend routes. She was transferred to the Baltic Sea operations of Silja Line but was not included in the 2006 sale of the company to Tallink.

In service with Hoverspeed 2001. Left fleet in 2001, returned to SeaCat.

Incat 81 metre (265') catamarans
 Diamant (Incat hull 041, built 1996).
 Purchased by Holyman before completion in 1996 she was launched as Holyman Express but was renamed Holyman Diamant in 1997 as a result of a competition to decide the names of the fast ferries for use on the Holyman Sally service between Ramsgate and Ostend. In 1998 Holyman Hoverspeed was formed and the vessel's name was shortened to Diamant. Her UK base of operations was moved to Dover and she received Seacat livery. Hoverspeed eventually purchased Holyman's share and Diamant came under Sea Containers ownership. She remained on the Dover – Ostend route until 2001 where she operated on the Newhaven – Dieppe route for the summer season.  In 2002 she briefly operated for IOMSPC before commencing her last summer on Newhaven – Dieppe. In 2004 she transferred to Dover – Calais where she remained until the closure of the service in November 2005 . For her last two seasons in Hoverspeed service she wore a distinctive Union Flag livery in an attempt to show how British Hoverspeed were, Diamant was built in Australia, owned by a Bermuda registered company and the vessel itself was registered in Nassau, Bahamas and later moved to the Italian Registry as Seacat Diamant. Along with her sister she has been reported as sold to Balearia. She left Liverpool (where she was chartered to the Isle of Man Steam Packet Company to provide additional capacity for the 2006 TT races period) for Oporto, Portugal (unlike Rapide which sailed to Algeciras) on 20 June 2006, two days after her sister left Tilbury. As of July 2006, she was chartered to Balearia Eurolineas of Spain and renamed Jaume III.

 Rapide (Incat hull 038, built 1996).
 Built for Holyman as Condor 12 she initially operated for Condor Ferries which at the time was part owned by Holyman.  She was replaced by a larger fastcraft in 1997 and moved to Holyman Sally's Ramsgate - Ostend service. As was the case with Diamant she was renamed Holyman Rapide as a result of a competition.  In 1998 she was transferred to Holyman Hoverspeed along with her sister  and the vessel's name was shortened to Rapide. She briefly returned to Condor Ferries to cover for the refit of Condor Express and operated between Poole and the Channel Islands for one month.  Along with the Diamant, Rapide came under Sea Containers ownership.  She remained on the Dover – Ostend route until 2001 when she moved to the Sea Containers/IOMSPC Liverpool – Dublin service.  In 2002 she moved to Heysham – Belfast and eventually replaced Seacat Scotland on the Belfast – Troon service in 2003 until the end of the 2004 season. In 2005 she transferred to Dover – Calais alongside her sister where she remained until the closure of the service in the same year . She was renamed Seacat Rapide upon her transfer to the Italian register. She also received the Hoverspeed Union Flag livery. On 18 June 2006 she sailed from her lay-up spot at Tilbury, London to Algeciras. She has now been sold to Baleària Eurolineas and renamed Jaume II.

Closure 
After sustaining losses annually since 1995 (the last financial year the company returned a pre-tax profit) it was clear, by the early 2000s, Hoverspeed could no longer continue operating business-as-usual.

 Competition from the Channel Tunnel

Despite the introduction of the Super SeaCats, Hoverspeed could not match EuroTunnel both in terms of economies of scale and pricing.  This became apparent in the company's pre-tax profits immediately following the opening of the Channel Tunnel in May 1994.

 End of Duty Free-Sales

Lucrative duty-free sales came to an end in July 1999 when the European Union removed tariffs between members states.

Consequently, Sea Containers announced it refused to support Hoverspeed’s losses on the English Channel and that they would cease operations on the Dover-Calais route, ending over 40 years of service.

Company wind-down and Sale of Assets 
It was initially thought that both the 81m Seacats would move to Sea Containers Mediterranean services.  However in March 2006 both the Seacat Rapide and Seacat Diamant were put up for sale by Sea Containers.  Superseacat One which had operated for Hoverspeed on its now-closed  Newhaven – Dieppe (2000 and 2002–2004) and Dover – Calais / Ostend (2001) fast ferry services was sold in April 2006 to Acciona Trasmediterránea and was renamed Almudaina Dos.

Although the company ended Hovercraft service, they still retained ownership of the remaining 2 SR.N4s until 2006 when they were sold to Wensley Haydon-Baillie.  In 2016, following a transfer of ownership of both land and the craft to the Home & Communities Agency, a public campaign was launched to save one or both of the craft.

By Summer 2016, it was established that The Princess Anne would be saved and refurbished as a permanent exhibit at the Hovercraft Museum.  The fate of The Princess Margaret, which was not in such sound structural repair, was announced on 30 May 2018 - usable parts will be moved to The Princess Anne and the craft will be scrapped.

The closure of Hoverspeed left a single company in the United Kingdom still operating hovercraft flights, Hovertravel.

Hoverports

Dover Hoverport 
Since the closure of Hoverspeed in 2005, the Dover Hoverport had remained unused until SpeedFerries moved to the site from the Eastern Docks.  They operated from the hoverport to Boulogne from Easter 2007 until November 2008 when SpeedFerries went into administration and their services ceased.  The hoverport site then lay abandoned for the second time in its thirty-year history until demolition of the site began in May 2009 in preparation for the redevelopment of the Western Docks and a new Cruise Terminal.

Calais and Boulogne Hoverports 
Following expansion of Calais port in January 2016, Calais Hoverport  was subsequently demolished, only Boulogne (Le Portel) hoverport site remains, albeit long abandoned and derelict.

References

Citations

General and cited references

External links 
 

1981 establishments in England
2005 disestablishments in England
Connections across the English Channel
Defunct shipping companies of the United Kingdom
Hovercraft
Transport companies disestablished in 2005
Transport companies established in 1981